"Yura・Yura～Vibration" is Fayray's second single. It was released on October 21, 1998 and peaked at #28. The song was used as the ending theme for the Fuji TV program "Hey! Hey! Hey! Music Champ".

Track listing
Yura・Yura～Vibration (Swaying vibration)
Neon Tetra
Yura・Yura～Vibration (original backing track)

Charts 
"Yura・Yura～Vibration" - Oricon Sales Chart (Japan)

External links
Fayray Official Site

1998 singles
Fayray songs
1998 songs
Songs with lyrics by Akio Inoue
Songs written by Daisuke Asakura